Vyacheslava Vladyslavivna Frolova (also known as Slava Frolova), is a Ukrainian TV Presenter, and is one of three judges for Ukraine's Got Talent.

Biography 
Frolova was born in 1976 in Odesa. Since childhood, she was fond of art, so she enrolled herself in the Yasha Hordiienko Fine Arts Studio at the Odesa Palace of Pioneers. Then she entered the K. K. Kostandi Children's Art School No. 1, where she became seriously interested in sculpture. She received her primary education at the secondary school-gymnasium No. 9. In 1992, Slava Frolova entered the Moscow State University of Fine Arts named after M. B. Grekov, Faculty of Sculpture.

Personal life 
Frolova is married and has two children; Mark (born in 2003) and Serafima (in 2011).

References 

 
 
 

1976 births
Living people
Entertainers from Odesa
Ukrainian television presenters
Ukrainian radio presenters
Ukrainian women television presenters
Ukrainian women radio presenters